"Metal" Mike Chlasciak (born December 24, 1971) is a Polish-American musician, best known as the guitarist for heavy metal band Halford, led by Rob Halford.

Musical career
Chlasciak and Halford have toured the world several times over with the likes of Iron Maiden, Ozzy Osbourne and Mötley Crüe. Chlasciak has additionally toured with Bay Area thrash metal band Testament, Saturday Night Live's comedian Jim Breuer, and recorded and toured with Sebastian Bach. He has additionally shared stages or recordings with Bruce Dickinson of Iron Maiden, Axl Rose of Guns N' Roses, and Geoff Tate of Queensrÿche.

As a solo artist, Chlasciak supported Steve Morse, Yngwie Malmsteen, Ronnie Montrose, Savatage, Primal Fear, and Eric Martin of Mr. Big. Chlasciak's solo band PainmuseuM has toured with Halford, Testament, Amon Amarth and others. Chlasciak's has contributed songs to the Songs from the Garage album from Saturday Night Live alumnus Jim Breuer and has provided lead guitar duties for his band, Jim Breuer and The Loud & Rowdy.

In 2017, Chlasciak put together a new solo band with musicians Marc Lopes (Ross the Boss, Let Us Prey), Mike LePond (Symphony X, Silent Assassins) and Ronnie Lipnicki (Overkill). In 2021 Mike LePond was replaced with bassist Mike Davis (Halford, Dramarama). The group headlines its own shows, small festivals and has supported melodic rockers Dokken at 2019 US East Coast dates.

In 2018, Chlasciak was inducted into the Heavy Metal Hall of Fame alongside Lzzy Hale (Halestorm), Billy Sheehan (Talas, Mr. Big, Sons of Apollo) and Bill Ward of Black Sabbath.

Other ventures
Chlasciak is a scholarship graduate of Berklee College of Music. He also writes his own monthly "Metal for Life" column in Guitar World and often contributes career and music related blogs for guitarworld.com and other publications. Chlasciak released several metal guitar instructional books and DVDs. Chlasciak also oversees Metal Heroes Academy, a website for artists and guitarists in the metal genre. The annual Metal Heroes Summer Camp and Metal Mike's Ultimate Metal Guitar Retreat, which take place in upstate New York's Catskill Mountains, are Metal Heroes' crown jewels. Chlasciak continues to lead workshops and clinics across the US spotlighting heavy metal guitar playing.

Discography

As Mike Chlasciak 
 Territory: Guitar Kill!!! (2000)

As Metal Mike Chlasciak 
 The Spilling (2001)
 This Is War (EP) (2012)
 The Metalworker (2013)
 The Metalworker Demos + 6 (2020)
 The Metal Squire: Early Battles + 4 (2021)

With Isolation Chamber 
 Grind Textural Abstractions (1996)

With Halford 
 Resurrection (2000)
 Live Insurrection (2001)
 Crucible (2002)
 Fourging the Furnace (2003)
 Silent Screams (2006)
 Metal God Essentials, Vol. 1 (2007)
 Halford III - Winter Songs (2009)
 Live in Anaheim – Original soundtrack (2010)
 Halford IV: Made of Metal (2010)
 Live at Saitama Super Arena – Original soundtrack (2011)
 Live in London (2012)
 The Essential Rob Halford (2015)
 Extended Versions (2015)
 The Complete Albums Collection (2017)

With John West 
 Earthmaker (2002)

With Joacim Cans 
 Beyond the Gates (2004)

With Painmuseum 
 Metal for Life (2005)
 You Have the Right to Remain Violent (2006)

With Sebastian Bach 
 Angel Down (2007)

Bibliography 
 Ridiculous Riffs for the Terrifying Guitarist (2007)
 Monster Coordination – Guitar Boot Camp (2007)
 This River Shall Burn (2011)
 Classic Metal Essentials – Download pack (2012)
 Chromaticity - My Best Exercises For Achieving Speed, Coordination & Fluidity (2021)
 Chromaticity 2 - The Ultimate Collection Of Speed, Precision & Stretch Developers (2022)

Filmography

With Halford 
 Live at Rock in Rio (2008)
 Live in Anaheim (2010)
 Live at Saitama Super Arena (2011)

With Sebastian Bach 
 Road Rage (2007)

Solo 
 Metal for Life! (2013)
 20 Essential Metal Licks (2013)

Guest appearances

Recordings 
 Let Us Prey - Let Us Prey (2020)
 Mike LePond - Silent Assassins (2014)
 Iceland - Iceland (2013)
 Sylencer - A Lethal Dose of Truth (2012)
 Ralf Scheepers - Scheepers (2010)
 Michael Vescera - A Sign of Things to Come (2008)
 Delta - Crashbreaker (2008)
 Primal Fear - Metal Is Forever (2006)
 Doctor Butcher - Doctor Butcher (2005)
 Dream Evil - The Book of Heavy Metal (2004)
 Consortium Project III - Terra Incognita (2003)
 Michael Vescera Project - The Altar (2003)
 Primal Fear - Black Sun (2002)
 Tribute to The Priest (2002)
 Tribute to Led Zeppelin - The Music Remains the Same (2002)
 Heavy Metal Geomatrix - Game Soundtrack (2001)
 Tribute to Joe Satriani - Crushing Days (2001)
 Tribute to Jason Becker - Warmth in the Wilderness (2001)
 Tribute to Yngwie Malmsteen - A Guitar Oddysey (2000)
 Metro Playoff Fever (2003)

Filmography 
 Bang Your Head Festival - 10th Anniversary (2006)
 Primal Fear - The History of Fear (2006)

References

External links
 
 

1971 births
Living people
Berklee College of Music alumni
People from Wayne, New Jersey
Place of birth missing (living people)
Polish heavy metal guitarists
Polish musicians
21st-century Polish musicians
Halford (band) members
Testament (band) members